Below is the list of populated places in Artvin Province, Turkey by the districts. In the following lists, first place in each list is the administrative center of the district.

Artvin 
Artvin	
Ağıllar, Artvin
Ahlat, Artvin
Alabalık, Artvin
Aşağımaden, Artvin
Bağcılar, Artvin
Bakırköy, Artvin
Ballıüzüm, Artvin
Beşağıl, Artvin
Çimenli, Artvin
Derinköy, Artvin
Dikmenli, Artvin
Dokuzoğul, Artvin
Erenler, Artvin
Fıstıklı, Artvin
Hamamlı, Artvin
Hızarlı, Artvin
Kalburlu, Artvin
Köseler, Artvin
Okumuşlar, Artvin
Ormanlı, Artvin
Ortaköy, Artvin
Oruçlu, Artvin
Pırnallı, Artvin
Sakalar, Artvin
Salkımlı, Artvin
Sarıbudak, Artvin
Seyitler, Artvin
Sünbüllü, Artvin
Şehitlik, Artvin
Taşlıca, Artvin
Tütüncüler, Artvin
Varlık, Artvin
Vezirköy, Artvin
Yanıklı, Artvin
Yukarımaden, Artvin
Zeytinlik, Artvin

Ardanuç
Ardanuç	
Akarsu, Ardanuç
Anaçlı, Ardanuç
Aşağıırmaklar, Ardanuç
Aşıklar, Ardanuç
Avcılar, Ardanuç
Aydınköy, Ardanuç
Bağlıca, Ardanuç
Ballı, Ardanuç
Beratlı, Ardanuç
Bereket, Ardanuç
Boyalı, Ardanuç
Bulanık, Ardanuç
Cevizlik, Ardanuç
Çakıllar, Ardanuç
Çıralar, Ardanuç
Ekşinar, Ardanuç
Ferhatlı, Ardanuç
Geçitli, Ardanuç
Gökçe, Ardanuç
Güleş, Ardanuç
Gümüşhane, Ardanuç
Hamurlu, Ardanuç
Harmanlı, Ardanuç
Hisarlı, Ardanuç
İncilli, Ardanuç
Kapıköy, Ardanuç
Karlı, Ardanuç
Kaşıkçı Ardanuç
Kızılcık, Ardanuç
Konaklı, Ardanuç
Kutlu, Ardanuç
Meşeköy, Ardanuç
Müezzinler, Ardanuç
Naldöken, Ardanuç
Ovacık, Ardanuç
Örtülü, Ardanuç
Peynirli, Ardanuç
Sakarya, Ardanuç
Soğanlı, Ardanuç
Tepedüzü, Ardanuç
Torbalı, Ardanuç
Tosunlu, Ardanuç
Tütünlü, Ardanuç
Ustalar, Ardanuç
Yaylacık, Ardanuç
Yolağzı, Ardanuç
Yolüstü, Ardanuç
Yukarıırmaklar, Ardanuç
Zekeriyaköy, Ardanuç

Arhavi 

Arhavi
Aşağıhacılar, Arhavi
Aşağışahinler, Arhavi
Balıklı, Arhavi
Başköy, Arhavi
Boyuncuk, Arhavi
Cumhuriyet, Arhavi
Derecik, Arhavi
Dereüstü, Arhavi
Dikyamaç, Arhavi
Dülgerli, Arhavi
Güneşli, Arhavi
Güngören, Arhavi
Gürgencik, Arhavi
Kavak, Arhavi
Kemerköprü, Arhavi
Kestanealan, Arhavi
Kireçlik, Arhavi
Konaklı, Arhavi
Küçükköy, Arhavi
Musazade, Arhavi
Ortacalar, Arhavi
Sırtoba, Arhavi
Soğucak, Arhavi
Şenköy, Arhavi
Tepeyurt, Arhavi
Ulaş, Arhavi
Ulukent, Arhavi
Üçırmak, Arhavi
Üçler, Arhavi
Yemişlik, Arhavi
Yıldızlı, Arhavi
Yolgeçen, Arhavi
Yukarıhacılar, Arhavi
Yukarışahinler, Arhavi

Borçka 

Borçka
Adagül, Borçka
Akpınar, Borçka
Alaca, Borçka
Ambarlı, Borçka
Aralık, Borçka
Arkaköy, Borçka
Atanoğlu, Borçka
Avcılar, Borçka
Balcı, Borçka
Camili, Borçka
Civan, Borçka
Çavuşlu, Borçka
Çaylıköy, Borçka
Çifteköprü, Borçka
Demirciler, Borçka
Düzenli, Borçka
Düzköy, Borçka
Efeler, Borçka
Fındıklı, Borçka
Güneşli, Borçka
Güreşen, Borçka
Güzelyurt, Borçka
İbrikli, Borçka
Kale, Borçka
Karşıköy, Borçka
Kayadibi, Borçka
Kayalar, Borçka
Kaynarca, Borçka
Küçükköy, Borçka
Maralköy, Borçka
Muratlı, Borçka
Örücüler, Borçka
Şerefiye, Borçka
Taraklı, Borçka
Uğurköy, Borçka
Yeşilköy, Borçka
Zorlu, Borçka

Hopa 

Hopa
Akdere, Hopa
Balık, Hopa
Başköy, Hopa
Başoba, Hopa
Bucak, Hopa
Cumhuriyet, Hopa
Çamlı, Hopa
Çamurlu, Hopa
Çavuşlu, Hopa
Çimenli, Hopa
Dereiçi, Hopa
Esenkıyı, Hopa
Eşmekaya, Hopa
Gümüşdere, Hopa
Güneşli, Hopa
Güvercinli, Hopa
Hendek, Hopa
Karaosmaniye, Hopa
Kaya, Hopa
Kazimiye, Hopa
Kemalpaşa, Hopa
Koyuncular, Hopa
Köprücü, Hopa
Kuledibi, Hopa
Liman, Hopa
Osmaniye, Hopa
Pınarlı, Hopa
Sarp, Hopa
Selimiye, Hopa
Subaşı, Hopa
Sugören, Hopa
Üçkardeş, Hopa
Yeşilköy, Hopa
Yoldere, Hopa

Murgul
Murgul
Akantaş, Murgul
Ardıçlı, Murgul
Başköy, Murgul
Çimenli, Murgul
Damar, Murgul
Erenköy, Murgul
Kabaca, Murgul
Korucular, Murgul
Küre, Murgul
Özmal, Murgul
Petek, Murgul

Şavşat 

Şavşat
Akdamla, Şavşat
Arpalı, Şavşat
Aşağıkoyunlu, Şavşat
Atalar, Şavşat
Cevizli, Şavşat
Ciritdüzü, Şavşat
Çağlıpınar, Şavşat
Çağlıyan, Şavşat
Çamlıca, Şavşat
Çavdarlı, Şavşat
Çayağzı, Şavşat
Çermik, Şavşat
Çiftlik, Şavşat
Çoraklı, Şavşat
Çukur, Şavşat
Dalkırmaz, Şavşat
Demirci, Şavşat
Demirkapı, Şavşat
Dereiçi, Şavşat
Dutlu, Şavşat
Düzenli, Şavşat
Elmalı, Şavşat
Erikli, Şavşat
Eskikale, Şavşat
Hanlı, Şavşat
Ilıca, Şavşat
Karaağaç, Şavşat
Karaköy, Şavşat
Kayabaşı, Şavşat
Kayadibi, Şavşat
Kirazlı, Şavşat
Kireçli, Şavşat
Kocabey, Şavşat
Köprülü, Şavşat
Köprüyaka, Şavşat
Kurudere, Şavşat
Küplüce, Şavşat
Maden, Şavşat
Meşeli, Şavşat
Meydancık, Şavşat
Oba, Şavşat
Otluca, Şavşat
Pınarlı, Şavşat
Savaş, Şavşat
Saylıca, Şavşat
Sebzeli, Şavşat
Susuz, Şavşat
Şalcı, Şavşat
Şenköy, Şavşat
Şenocak, Şavşat
Tepebaşı, Şavşat
Tepeköy, Şavşat
Üzümlü, Şavşat
Veliköy, Şavşat
Yağlı, Şavşat
Yamaçlı, Şavşat
Yaşar, Şavşat
Yavuzköy, Şavşat
Yeşilce, Şavşat
Yoncalı, Şavşat
Yukarıkoyunlu, Şavşat
Ziyaret, Şavşat

Yusufeli 

Yusufeli
Alanbaşı, Yusufeli
Altıparmak, Yusufeli
Arpacık, Yusufeli
Avcılar, Yusufeli
Bademkaya, Yusufeli
Bahçeli, Yusufeli
Bakırtepe, Yusufeli
Balalan, Yusufeli
Balcılı, Yusufeli
Bıçakçılar, Yusufeli
Bostancı, Yusufeli
Boyalı, Yusufeli
Cevizlik, Yusufeli
Çağlıyan, Yusufeli
Çamlıca, Yusufeli
Çeltikdüzü, Yusufeli
Çevreli, Yusufeli
Çıralı, Yusufeli
Dağeteği, Yusufeli
Darıca, Yusufeli
Demirdöven, Yusufeli
Demirkent, Yusufeli
Demirköy, Yusufeli
Dereiçi, Yusufeli
Dokumacılar, Yusufeli
Erenköy, Yusufeli
Esendal, Yusufeli
Esenyaka, Yusufeli
Gümüşözü, Yusufeli
Günyayla, Yusufeli
Havuzlu, Yusufeli
Irmakyanı, Yusufeli
İnanlı, Yusufeli
İşhan, Yusufeli
Kılıçkaya, Yusufeli
Kınalıçam, Yusufeli
Kirazalan, Yusufeli
Kömürlü, Yusufeli
Köprügören, Yusufeli
Küplüce, Yusufeli
Morkaya, Yusufeli
Mutlugün, Yusufeli
Narlık, Yusufeli
Ormandibi, Yusufeli
Öğdem, Yusufeli
Özgüven, Yusufeli
Pamukçular, Yusufeli
Sebzeciler, Yusufeli
Serinsu, Yusufeli
Sütlüce, Yusufeli
Tarakçılar, Yusufeli
Taşkıran, Yusufeli
Tekkale, Yusufeli
Yağcılar, Yusufeli
Yamaçüstü, Yusufeli
Yarbaşı, Yusufeli
Yaylalar, Yusufeli
Yeniköy, Yusufeli
Yokuşlu, Yusufeli
Yüksekoba, Yusufeli
Yüncüler, Yusufeli
Zeytincik, Yusufeli

References 

Artvin Province
Artvin
List